Marita Geraghty (born March 26, 1962) is an American television and film actress. She had roles in several movies during the late 1980s and early 1990s, most notably as Nancy Taylor in Groundhog Day. She was married to actor Michael Maguire.

Geraghty was born in Chicago, Illinois. She graduated from the University of Illinois and made her Broadway debut in 1987 in Coastal Disturbances.

Filmography

Film

No Mercy (1986) - Alice Collins
Hiding Out (1987) - Janie Rooney
Broadcast News (1987) - Date-Rape Woman
Fresh Horses (1988) - Maureen
Sleeping with the Enemy (1991) - Julie
This Is My Life (1992) - Mia Jablon
Hero (1992) - Joan
Groundhog Day (1993) - Nancy
Don Juan DeMarco (1994) - Woman in Restaurant
 (1995) - Carla Mitchelson
Use As Directed (2008, Short) - June

Television

Spenser: For Hire (1988) - Janet / Elizabeth Canning Anthony
Hard Time on Planet Earth (1989) - Karen
Law & Order (1990) - Rebecca Byrne
Against the Law (1990) - Mariella Wilson
To Save a Child (1991, TV Movie) - Isabella Larson
Woops! (1992) - Suzanne Stillman
Past Tense (1994, TV Movie) - Dawn Tripplet
Seinfeld (1994) - Margaret
Mad About You (1995) - Velma
Frasier (1996) - Amanda
Chicago Hope (1997) - Monica Blaine
The Luck of the Irish (2001, TV Movie) - Kate O'Reilly Johnson / Kate Smith
Judging Amy (2001) - Julie Baker
CSI: Crime Scene Investigation (2003) - Jane Damon
Touched by an Angel (2003) - Deborah Jackson
Charmed (2003) - Katrina
Miss Match (2003) - Meaghan Smalls
Numb3rs (2005) - Jessica Avery
The Ex List (2009)

Stage work

Present Laughter (1986) 
Biloxi Blues (1986)
Coastal Disturbances (1987)
Spoils of War (1989)
The Night of the Iguana
The Heidi Chronicles
The Good Doctor (2000)
Distracted (2007)

References

External links

1965 births
Living people
American film actresses
American stage actresses
American television actresses
Actresses from Chicago
20th-century American actresses
21st-century American actresses